The 2022 North Central Cardinals football team represented North Central College as a member of the College Conference of Illinois and Wisconsin (CCIW) during the 2022 NCAA Division III football season. In their first year under head coach Brad Spencer, the Cardinals compiled a 14–0 record (9–0 against conference opponents) and won the CCIW championship. 

Through the first 14 games, the team's statistical leaders included Luke Lehnen with 2,568 passing yards, Ethan Greenfield with 1,878 rushing yards, 27 touchdowns, and 162 points scored, DeAngelo Hardy with 1,091 receiving yards, and BJ Adamchick with 86 tackles.

Schedule

Personnel

Players
 BJ Adamchik, No. 34, linebacker, 5'9", 207, sophomore, Raleigh, NC
 Julian Bell, No. 5, defensive back, 5'8", 166, junior, Oswego, IL
 Darius Byrd, No. 2, running back, 5'6", 177, senior, Bolingbrook, IL
 Jordan Chisum, No. 22, running back, 5'7", 197, sophomore, Zion, IL
 Angelo Cusumano, No. 7, linebacker, 5'9", 208, sophomore, Carol Stream, IL
 Ethan Greenfield, No. 8, running back, 5'9", 213, senior, Lindenhurst, IL
 Brandon Greifelt, No. 92, defensive line, 6'1", 279, Mount Prospect, IL
 DeAngelo Hardy, No. 6, wide receiver, 6'1", 202, junior, Lake Villa, IL
 Terrence Hill, No. 42, running back, 5'9", 205, senior, Effingham, IL
 Luke Lehnen, No. 5, quarterback, 5'11", 189, sophomore, Chatham, IL
 Dan Lester, No. 97, defensive line, 6'1", 287, junior, Indian Creek, IL
 Joey Lombardi, No. 13, wide receiver, 5'10", 160, junior, Chicago, IL
 Zack Orr, No. 10, defensive back, 6'1", 195, sophomore, Mokena, IL
 Jacob Paradee, No. 3, wide receiver, 5'9", 162, soophomore, Moweaqua, IL
 Tanner Rains, No. 27, kicker, 6'0", 216, sophomore, Plainfield, IL
 Tyler Rich, No. 99, defensive line, 6'3", 270, senior, Pontiac, IL
 Nick Rummell No. 8, defensive back, 5'11", 165, junior, Gilberts, IL
 Joe Sacco, No. 24, running back, 5'9", 175, sophomore, Bartlett, IL
 Sam Taviani, No. 14, defensive back, 6'1", 208, senior, Downers Grove, IL
 Antwain Walker, No. 26, defensive back, 6'1", 201, junior, Oswego, IL

Coaching staff
 Brad Spencer, head coach
 Shane Dierking, assistant head coach, defensive coordinator
 Tim Janecek, defensive line coach, strength coordinator
 Eric Stuedemann, offensive coordinator, offensive line coach
 Colin Wood, special teams coordinator, cornerbacks coach

References

North Central
North Central Cardinals football seasons
NCAA Division III Football Champions
College football undefeated seasons
North Central Cardinals football